The 2021 Pinstripe Bowl was a college football bowl game played on December 29, 2021, with kickoff at 2:15 p.m. EST and televised on ESPN. It was the 11th edition of the Pinstripe Bowl (after the 2020 edition was cancelled due to the COVID-19 pandemic), and was one of the 2021–22 bowl games concluding the 2021 FBS football season. Sponsored by the New Era Cap Company, the game was officially known as the New Era Pinstripe Bowl. The Terrapins would score 54 points while only allowing 10 en route to their first win in a bowl game since the 2010 Military Bowl.

Teams
Consistent with conference tie-ins, the game was played between teams from the Big Ten Conference and the Atlantic Coast Conference (ACC).

This was the 32nd meeting between Maryland and Virginia Tech; entering the bowl, the Terrapins led the all-time series, 16–15. From 2004 to 2013, the Terrapins and the Hokies both competed as members of the ACC.

Maryland Terrapins

With a 30 to 24 win over rival West Virginia and a 62 to 0 win over (FCS) Howard, the Terps started their season 4-0. They then lost their next 3 games to Iowa, Ohio State, and Minnesota. Next, they had a 38 to 35 win over Indiana. Again they lost 3 games in a row to Penn State, Michigan State, and Michigan. Finally, with a 40 to 16 win over Rutgers, the Terps finished their season 6-6 and were able to play in a bowl game for the first time since 2016. On December 4, 2021, they accepted an invite to play in the New Era Pinstripe Bowl against Virginia Tech.

Virginia Tech Hokies

The Hokies started the season on a 1-0 start after upsetting the then #10 ranked North Carolina Tarheels. After successfully beating Middle Tennessee, the Hokies found themselves ranked at #15. Going into week 3 they faced rivals, West Virginia. After a devastating loss to the Mountaineers 27-21, the Hokies fell to 2-1 and out of the AP poll rankings. Virginia Tech then had a bounceback game against the Richmond Spiders (FCS). The Hokies came up on top 21-10 and with the win advanced to 3-1. Virginia Tech then ended up going on a 3 game losing streak, losing to Notre Dame, Pittsburgh, and Syracuse. They beat Georgia Tech the next week to increase their record to 4-4. The next week, They had a loss to Boston College to make them 4-5. They got their revenge when they beat Duke to become 5-5. After this, they lost to Miami to make them 5-6. Finally, a surprise win over rival Virginia clinched the Hokies a bowl bid. On December 4, 2021, they accepted an invite to play in the New Era Pinstripe Bowl against Maryland.

Game summary

Statistics
Team statistics
Individual statistics

References

External links
 Game statistics at statbroadcast.com

Pinstripe Bowl
Pinstripe Bowl
Maryland Terrapins football bowl games
Virginia Tech Hokies football bowl games
Pinstripe Bowl
2020s in the Bronx
Pinstripe Bowl